Stavros Tziortzis (born 15 September 1948) is a Greek-Cypriot former hurdler who competed in the 1972 Summer Olympics (6th place) and in the 1976 Summer Olympics representing Greece. He was named the 1972 and 1974 Greek Athlete of the Year.

References

1948 births
Living people
Greek male hurdlers
Cypriot male hurdlers
Olympic male hurdlers
Olympic athletes of Greece
Athletes (track and field) at the 1972 Summer Olympics
Athletes (track and field) at the 1976 Summer Olympics
Mediterranean Games gold medalists for Greece
Mediterranean Games bronze medalists for Greece
Mediterranean Games gold medalists in athletics
Mediterranean Games medalists in athletics
Athletes (track and field) at the 1971 Mediterranean Games
Athletes (track and field) at the 1975 Mediterranean Games
Balkan Athletics Championships winners
People from Famagusta District